Logic system may refer to:
 A type of Formal system
 Logic System, a musical project of Japanese composer and programmer Hideki Matsutake